Stephen Fensham (born 17 September 1985) is a South African cricketer. He played in four first-class and six List A matches for Eastern Province in 2005 and 2006.

See also
 List of Eastern Province representative cricketers

References

External links
 

1985 births
Living people
South African cricketers
Eastern Province cricketers
Cricketers from Port Elizabeth